is a Japanese DJ and music producer. He formed the band Capsule in 1997 with vocalist Toshiko Koshijima and himself as composer and record producer when both were 17. The band debuted in 2001 with the song "Sakura".

He is known for being the music producer of Japanese girl group Perfume and Japanese model-turned-singer Kyary Pamyu Pamyu since 2003 and 2011, respectively. These artists have gained commercial success for their songs that Nakata wrote and produced, such as "Chocolate Disco", "Polyrhythm", "Fashion Monster", and "Ninja Re Bang Bang". Nakata has worked with several other Japanese pop singers, including MEG, Ami Suzuki and SMAP, and has also remixed songs by other artists, including M-Flo and Leah Dizon. He ran his own label, Contemode, in association with Yamaha. After Towa Tei, he was the second Japanese artist to officially remix Kylie Minogue, contributing a version of her single "Get Outta My Way". He also formed Coltemonikha with singer, model and fashion designer Kate Sakai. In July 2012, he won the "Creator" award for the "Change Maker of the Year 2012" event. The Japan Record Awards also awarded Nakata the Best Music Arrangement Award twice, the first for the songs "Tsukema Tsukeru" by Kyary Pamyu Pamyu and "Spice" by Perfume in 2012, and the second one for Kyary's songs "Harajuku Iyahoi" and "Easta" in 2017. Nakata released his first solo album, Digital Native, on February 7, 2018.

As of September 25, 2019, Nakata has yielded a total of ten number-one albums, mostly under his production with Perfume (six albums and two compilations) and Kyary Pamyu Pamyu (two albums).

Works

Discography
Studio albums
 Digital Native (2018)

Albums
Studio albums listed are full-length original studio albums fully produced by Yasutaka Nakata.

Produced artists
 Capsule (1997–present)
 Perfume (2003–present)
 Kyary Pamyu Pamyu (2011–present)
 Momo Mashiro (2017–present)

Collaborations

 Coltemonikha
From 2006 to 2007 and 2011
 Copter4016882
 E-Girls
Music Flyer (album track)
 Masatoshi Hamada (as Hamada Bamyu Bamyu)
Nandeyanen-nen (single)
 Marina Inoue
Beautiful Story (single)
 Crystal Kay 
Best of Crystal Kay (compilation album)
Step by Step
 Aiko Kayō
Cosmic Cosmetics (single)(composer/arranger)
 Kizuna AI
 AIAIAI (single)
 Marino
 Lollipop (mini album)
Flavor
La La Li Lu
 Seiko Matsuda
Wakusei ni Naritai (album track)
 Meg 
Composer, arranger and producer from 2007 to 2012
 Minmi
I Love (album)
Kaze ni Nosete
Lalala (Ai no Uta) (single)
"Taiyō no Shita de"
 Nagisa Cosmetic
 Natsume Mito
Songwriter and producer from 2015 to 2017
 Perfume and OK Go
I Don't Understand You (digital single) (arrangement and Japanese lyrics only; co-produced with Damian Kulash)
 Sarina
Violin Diva: 2nd Set (album)
Cyber Girl
 Scandal
Standard (album)
Overdrive (single) (as writer and co-arranger)
 Ringo Sheena
Ukina (compilation album)
Netsuai Hakkakuchū
 SMAP
Chan To Shi Nai To Ne (limited-run single)
Super Modern Artistic Performance (album)
Kokoro Puzzle Rhythm
Top of the World/Amazing Discovery (single)
Amazing Discovery
 Ami Suzuki 
Free Free/Super Music Maker (single)
Supreme Show (album)
One (single)
Can't Stop the Disco (single)
Tackey and Tsubasa
Trip & Treasure (EP)
Spotlight
 Tomohisa Yamashita
Asobi (EP)
Back to the Dancefloor
Ero (album)
Baby Baby
Kenshi Yonezu
Nanimono (single)
Shonan no Kaze
Ichibanka (EP)
Daoko
Bokura no Network (single)

Remixes

Steve Aoki and Moxie Raia / I Love It When You Cry
Thelma Aoyama / Rhythm (リズム)
Clazziquai Project / Beat in Love
Clazziquai Project / Kiss Kiss Kiss
Leah Dizon / Koi Shiyo (恋しよう♪)
Dorlis × Maki Nomiya × Yasutaka Nakata (capsule) featuring coba / Lovey Dovey
Nana Furuhara - Futari no Mojipittan (ふたりのもじぴったん)
Juju / Sayonara no Kawari ni
Kaleido / Meu Sonho
m-flo featuring BoA / the love bug
m-flo Loves Minmi / Lotta Love
Madeon featuring Passion Pit / Pay No Mind
Meg / Freak
Meg / rockstar
Mini / Are U Ready?
Kylie Minogue / Get Outta My Way
Kylie Minogue / Into the Blue
Passion Pit / "The Reeling"
Ram Rider / Kimi ga Suki (きみがすき)
Ram Rider / Sun Lights Stars
Rip Slyme / Nettaiya
SMAP / Yozora no Mukou (夜空ノムコウ)
Spaghetti Vabune! / Favorite Song
Alexandra Stan / Mr. Saxobeat
Ami Suzuki / A token of love
Sweetbox / Everything Is Gonna Be Alright (Next Generation 2009)
Asako Toki - Kimi ni Mune Kyun (君に胸キュン)
Tokyo Ska Paradise Orchestra / Ryuusei no Ballad
TRF / Ez Do Dance (retracked by Yasutaka Nakata)
Zedd and Alessia Cara / Stay

Other works
Nakata composed the station departure melody to be used on the Hokuriku Shinkansen platforms at Kanazawa Station in his hometown Kanazawa from March 2015.
He has also contributed a composition that was featured in the Closing ceremony of the Rio 2016 Olympic Games titled "1620" which was produced to highlight Japan's electronic dance culture which also featured choreography from MIKIKO.

Awards

References

External links
 

 
1980 births
Living people
People from Kanazawa, Ishikawa
Japanese electronic musicians
Japanese record producers
Japanese electro musicians
Japanese house musicians
Japanese dance musicians
Japanese techno musicians
Video game musicians
Musicians from Ishikawa Prefecture
Japanese DJs
Electronic dance music DJs